William Quentery (1861 – 9 June 1940) was a New Zealand cricketer. He played one first-class match for Auckland 1893/94.

See also
 List of Auckland representative cricketers

References

External links
 

1861 births
1940 deaths
New Zealand cricketers
Auckland cricketers
People from Peckham
Cricketers from Greater London